Vila Medeiros is a district located in the northeastern district of the city of São Paulo. 

Districts of São Paulo